Jukebox School of Music is the fifth album by folk guitarist Sandy Bull, released in 1988 through ROM Records. It was his first release in over fifteen years.

Release and reception 

Allmusic writer Jason Ankeny wrote: "A walking encyclopedia of musical instruments and styles, Bull illustrates the sheer breadth of his mastery on Jukebox School of Music." He gave the album three out of five stars, stating that despite being eclectic it is also exhausting overall. Critic Byron Coley of Spin described it as "a diary of Sandy's musical thoughts over the last decade", calling the acoustic tracks "humanly felt, deeply contemplative crystalline structures."

Track listing

Personnel 
Sandy Bull – guitar

References 

1988 albums
Sandy Bull albums